Abu Muhammad Shihab al-Din Ahmad ibn Muhammad ibn Abd Allah ibn Ibrahim also known as Muhammad ibn Arabshah (1389–1450), was an Arab writer and traveller who lived under the reign of Timur (1370–1405).

He was born and grew up in Damascus. Later when Timur invaded Syria, he moved to Samarkand and later to Transoxiana. He later moved to Edirne and worked in the court of Sultan Mehmed I translating Arabic books to Turkish and Persian. He later returned to Damascus after having been absent from the city for 23 years. Later he moved to Egypt and died there.

The famous Muslim scholar, Abd al-Wahhab ibn Arabshah, was his son.

His works 
 Aja'ib al-Maqdur fi Nawa'ib al-Taymur (The Wonders of Destiny of the Ravages of Timur), which he finished in Damascus on 12 August 1435. This book was translated and printed first time in Latin;  Ahmedis Arabsiadae Vitae & rerum gestarum Timuri, qui vulgo Tamerlanes dicitur, historia. Lugduni Batavorum, ex typographia Elseviriana, 1636.
 al-Ta'lif al-tahir fi shiyam al-Malik al-Zahir (Life of Zahir)
 Fakihat al-Khulafa' wa Mufakahat al-Zurafa'
 Jami' al-Hikayat; translated from Persian to Turkish.
 al-'Aqd al-Farid fi al-Tawhid
 Ghurrat al-Siyar fi Duwal al-Turk wa al-Tatar
 Muntaha al-Adab fi Lughat al-Turk wa al-Ajam wa al-'Arab

References

1389 births
1450 deaths
Arab writers
14th-century Arabs
15th-century Arabs
Hanafis
Maturidis
Translators from Arabic